Please Take Care of My Refrigerator, also known as Chef & My Fridge, is a South Korean cooking-variety program starring various chefs and celebrity guests. It airs on JTBC on Mondays at 21:30 (KST) beginning November 17, 2014. Since October 1, 2018, the program airs late at 23:00 (KST) on the same day, due to giving it regular broadcast timeline to JTBC's dramas. The last episode of this program aired on November 25, 2019, after five years of broadcast.

Format
In each episode, two guests have their refrigerators brought to the filming studio. The hosts go through each refrigerator, with the hosts, chefs, and guests commenting on unusual or otherwise notable foods. The hosts will sometimes "help" the guests by throwing away ingredients that are expired. The cast members sometimes sample a dish in the refrigerator. Each guest has four of the eight chefs assigned to them, and each guest presents two categories of food that he or she would like cooked. Examples of categories include Western-style food or a seafood dish that the guest's children would enjoy. Each of the four chefs chooses the category they wish to compete in, with two chefs competing in each category.

The two competing chefs have 15 minutes to cook a dish using ingredients from the guest's refrigerator. Some basic ingredients, like onions, are provided by the show. A host (Kim Sung-joo or Ahn Jung-hwan) will then sample the dishes in the middle of the cooking process and comment on their quality. Starting with the chef who finished cooking their dish first, each chef presents their dish to the guest and then to the remaining cast members. After commentary on the dishes, the guest selects the winner.

In earlier formats, all cast members (hosts, other chefs, and the other guest) voted on the winner, with the chef who finished earlier winning in the event of a draw.

Hosts

Main
Kim Sung-joo (episodes 1–254)
Ahn Jung-hwan (episodes 66–254)
Jeong Hyeong-don (episodes 1–47, 50–55)
Jeong Ga-eun (episodes 1–9)
Hwayobi (episodes 1–4)
Kim Ga-yeon (episodes 5–6)
 (episode 7)
Kim Ye-won (episodes 8–9)

Special
Chef Choi Hyun-seok & Kim Poong (episodes 48–49)
Jang Dong-min (episodes 56–57)
Heo Kyung-hwan (episodes 58–59, 62–63)
Lee Soo-geun (episodes 60–61)
Ahn Jung-hwan (episodes 64–65)

Chefs

List of episodes

Ratings

Ratings released by AGB Nielsen Korean and TNMS.

2014

2015

2016

2017

2018

2019

Cancellation of broadcasting

Awards and nominations

International versions
 – Currently airing
 – Ceased to air
 – Undetermined

References

External links
 

2014 South Korean television series debuts
2019 South Korean television series endings
Korean-language television shows
JTBC original programming
Television series by Signal Entertainment Group
South Korean variety television shows
South Korean cooking television series